The 2010 Suruga Bank Championship was the third edition of the match between the winners of the previous season's J. League Cup and the Copa Sudamericana. It was contested by the 2009 J. League Cup winner Tokyo and the 2009 Copa Sudamericana champion Ecuadorian club LDU Quito.

Qualified teams

Rules
The match was played normally according to the rules of the games, with a penalty shootout if the score was tied at the end of regulation. The official match ball was the Adidas Jabulani, the same used in the 2010 FIFA World Cup. Each team was allowed to bring a squad of 18 players for the match and used seven squad changes during the match. The winner of the match received the trophy plus $200,000; the runner-up earned $60,000.

Match details

References

External links
Official page on CONMEBOL's site
Details
Suruga Bank Championship on Universofutbol's.com site
All about 2010 Suruga Bank Championship

2010 in South American football
2010
2010 in Japanese football
L.D.U. Quito matches
FC Tokyo matches
Association football penalty shoot-outs
August 2010 sports events in Japan